Kandrash may refer to:
 Kandrash-e Babakhan
 Kandrash-e Gol Morad